Lieutenant General Johan Helge Fritiof Söderbom (21 May 1881 – 3 January 1975) was a senior Swedish Army officer. Söderbom served as head of the Quartermaster Staff from 1928 to 1935 and was Quartermaster-General and as commanding officer of the Swedish Army Quartermaster Corps from 1935 to 1946.

Early life
Söderbom was born on 21 May 1881 in Ekeberga Parish in Lessebo Municipality, Kronoberg County, Sweden the son of Janne Söderbom and his wife Anna Ekström. Söderbom passed mogenhetsexamen in Gävle in 1900. His brother Erik Söderbom (1894–1998), was a well-known sports journalist in Scania and chairman of Malmö AIF sports club in Malmö from 1941 to 1943.

Career

Sports career
Söderbom competed for IFK Gävle, where he was also chairman. In 1899, Söderbom won the Swedish Athletics Championships in the long jump with a jump of 5.73 meters. On 27 May 1900, he improved Gustaf Rundberg's unofficial Swedish record in long jump, from 6.17 to 6.20 meters. He kept the record until 1902, when Frans Frise improved it by six centimeters. At the Swedish Athletics Championships in 1900, he won gold in the 110 meter hurdles (18.0 seconds), long jump (5.66 meters) and triple jump (11.61 meters). Söderbom stopped competing in 1900.

Military career
Söderbom graduated from the Military Academy Karlberg in Stockholm in 1902 and was commissioned as an officer the same year, assigned to Hälsinge Regiment in Gävle as a underlöjtnant where he was promoted to lieutenant in 1905. He graduated as a finance and supply officer/quartermaster (intendent) in 1907 and was transferred in 1908 to the Swedish Army Quartermaster Corps, where he was appointed underintendent in 1908, intendent av 2. klass in 1909, intendent av 1. klass in 1914 and to captain in 1915. He served as adjutant to the Quartermaster-General of the Swedish Army from 1913 to 1917 and as regimental paymaster (regementsintendent) in the Position Artillery Regiment (Positionsartilleriregementet) from 1917 to 1919 and as head of the Fodder Section in the National Household Commission (Folkhushållningskommissionen) from 1918 to 1920. After that he was a teacher in military administration at the Royal Swedish Army Staff College from 1919 to 1924, and he was for a time active as a civilian as head of Filmstaden in Råsunda between 1920 and 1921.

Söderbom was an expert assistant in the Defence Inquiry (Försvarsutredningen) from 1920 to 1925, secretary of the Committee on Defence in the Riksdag in 1925, expert for the organization of the economic war preparedness in 1926, secretary in the preparation for the organization of the central defence administration from 1926 to 1927 and expert in administrative matters at the Ministry of Defence in Finland from 1926 to 1928, in which he led the work of reorganizing the administration of the Finnish Defence Forces. He was also chairman of the Quartermaster Department (Intendenturavdelningen) from 1926 to 1935 when he was appointed honorary chairman.

In 1924 Söderbom was promoted to major, after which he was divisional paymaster (fördelningsintendent) in the VI Army Division (VI. arméfördelningen) from 1925 to 1926. He was promoted to lieutenant colonel in 1926 and was head of the Maintenance Bureau at the Quartermaster Department (Intendenturdepartementet) in the Royal Swedish Army Materiel Administration from 1927 to 1928. In 1928 he was promoted to colonel, after which he was head of the Quartermaster Staff (Intendenturstaben) from 1928 to 1935. At this time he was also chairman of the experts for state procurement from 1933 to 1934. He was promoted to major general in 1935, after which he served as Quartermaster-General of the Swedish Army and head of the Swedish Army Quartermaster Corps from 1935 to 1946. In the years 1940–1941, Söderbom was an expert in investigations regarding the future organization of the central military administration. In his capacity as Quartermaster-General of the Swedish Army he was also vice chief of the Royal Swedish Army Materiel Administration from 1944 to 1946. Söderbom retired in 1946 and was then promoted to lieutenant general. His "organizational talent has gained general recognition, not least because during the contingency period 1939-1945 he had to lead the work of the army's quartermaster rearmament and be responsible for the maintenance of the mobilized forces".

Business career
Söderbom was a member of the board of AB Turitz & Co from 1946 to 1958 and chairman of the board of Börtzells Tryckeri AB and the General Staff's Lithographic Institute from 1947 to 1956.

Personal life
In 1906, Söderbom married Helga Kjöllerström (1881–1974), the daughter of Theodor Kjöllerström and Selma Klinghjerdt. They had one son, Åke Söderbom (1909–2002), a Swedish Army colonel.

Death
Söderbom died on 3 January 1975 in Uppsala domkyrkoförsamling in Uppsala County.

Dates of rank
1902 – Underlöjtnant
1905 – Lieutenant
1915 – Captain
1924 – Major
1926 – Lieutenant colonel
1928 – Colonel
1935 – Major general
1946 – Lieutenant general

Awards and decorations

Swedish
   Commander Grand Cross of the Order of the Sword (6 June 1942)
   Commander 1st Class of the Order of the Sword (25 November 1933)
   Knight of the Order of the Sword (1923)
   Knight of the Order of Vasa (1921)
   Knight of the Order of the Polar Star (1925)
   Home Guard Medal of Merit in gold
   Federation of Landstorm Associations Medal of Merit (1924)
  Stockholm Landstorm Association Medal of Merit (Stockholms landstormsförbunds förtjänstmedalj) (1926)
  Swedish Red Cross Silver Medal

Foreign
   Grand Cross of the Order of the Lion of Finland
   Grand Officer of the Order of the German Eagle
   Commander of the Order of the Dannebrog
   1st Class of the Order of the Cross of Liberty with swords
   Commander of the Order of the White Rose of Finland

Honours
Member of the Royal Swedish Academy of War Sciences (1927)

References

1881 births
1975 deaths
Swedish Army lieutenant generals
People from Lessebo Municipality
Members of the Royal Swedish Academy of War Sciences
20th-century Swedish military personnel
Swedish male long jumpers
Swedish male triple jumpers
Swedish male hurdlers
Commanders Grand Cross of the Order of the Sword
Knights of the Order of Vasa
Knights of the Order of the Polar Star
Sportspeople from Kronoberg County